The 2004–05 EHF Women's Cup Winners' Cup was the twenty-ninth edition of EHF's competition for women's handball national cup champions. It ran from October 8, 2004 to May 21, 2005.

1996 EHF Cup runner-up Larvik HK defeated 1996 Champions League champion Podravka Koprivnica to win its first European trophy. It was the third Cup Winners' Cup that went to Norway, after Bækkelagets SK's two titles in the late 1990s.

Results
First preliminary round. October 8–17, 2004

References

Women's EHF Cup Winners' Cup
2004 in handball
2005 in handball